Chuck Norris (born 1940) is an American martial artist, actor and media personality.

Chuck Norris may also refer to:

 Chuck Norris (politician) (1925–2009), an American politician, businessman, and military officer
 Chuck Norris (musician) (1921–1989), an American jazz and blues guitarist

See also
 Chuck
 Norris (surname)